Electric Earth & Other Elements: Remixes is a remix album released in 2001 by New Zealand electronica duo, Pitch Black.

Track listing
"Electric Earth (Video Edit)"
"Lizard Room (Rhythm Mix)" featuring Ekto
"Electric Earth (Part 3)" featuring Pylonz
"Unadrumma (Sunshine Sound System Remix)" featuring Downtown Brown
"Electric Earth (Part 5 Smll Hnds Rmx)" featuring Rotor+
"Soliton (Live At Heaven)"
"The 48 Skanks (48 Jars of Plum Sauce Mix)" featuring Rockwood
"Electric Earth (Part 6)" featuring Cuffy & Leon D
"Electric Earth (Part 4)" featuring Rook
"The 48 Skanks (4 to 7 Odds on the Sheffield Derby Mix)" featuring Roockwood

Pitch Black (band) albums
2001 remix albums